Giorgos Tsalikis (Γιώργος Τσαλίκης, born 25 October 1975) is a Greek Laïko music singer.

Discography

Albums 
 Αν ήμουνα παλιόπαιδο (Universal Music, 2001) Gold
 Για σένα ξενυχτάω (Universal Music, 2002) Gold
 Έκανα την νύχτα μέρα (Universal Music, 2003) Gold
 Ο τέλειος άντρας (Universal Music, 2004)
 Πυρετός (Universal Music, 2005)
 Αγάπη Αχάριστη (Universal Music, 2006)
 Τσαλίκης live (Universal Music, 2006)
 Ένοχα βράδια (Universal Music, 2007)
 10 χρόνια: Οι μεγαλύτερες επιτυχίες + 3 νέα τραγούδια (Universal Music,2010)
 Στο υπογράφω (Παπαπολιτικά, 2012) 3xPlatinum
 Κρυφτό (GABI Music, 2016)

Singles 
 "Θέλω να ονειρεύομαι μαζί σου" [cd single, 2003] Platinum
 "Πάρα Πολύ" (cd-single, Cobalt Music, 2009)
 "Στα πατώματα" (single, 2009)
 "Τα περαστικά μου" (single Universal Music, 2009) ft Master Tempo
 "Πάρ'το απόφαση" (single Universal Music, 2009) ft Master Tempo
 "Αν ήσουν αγάπη" [single, 2011]
 "Πανικός" [single, 2011]
 "Ξέχνα τα παλιά'" (single, 2011)
 "Δεν σου κάνω τον Άγιο" (Universal Music, single, 2013)
 "Απαγορευμένο" (Universal, single, 2013)
 "Θέλεις Πόλεμο" (GABI Music, 2013)
 "Απαγορευμένο 2 (GABI Music, 2013)
 "Είμαι μια χαρά"" (GABI Music, 2013)
 "Estar Loco" (GABI Music, 2014) ft Azis
 "Cocktail" (Epic Music, 2017) ft Kings
 "Σαντορίνη - Ομόνοια" (Spin Records, 2017)
 "Τρελός" (Epic Music, 2018)
 "Ανατροπή" (Epic Music, 2018)
 "Χωρίς Εσένα" (GABI Music, 2019)
 "Το Κομμένο Μου Τσιγάρο" (Heaven Music, 2020)
 "Φταίς" (Heaven Music, 2021)
 "Εσύ Τι Να Μου Πείς" (Heaven Music, 2021)
 "Σε Έχω Ήδη Ξεπεράσει" (Panik Platinum, 2022)

Filmography

Television

References

Living people
1975 births
21st-century Greek male singers